Prince George of Greece and Denmark (24 June 1869 – 25 November 1957) was the second son and child of George I of Greece and Olga Konstantinovna of Russia, and is remembered chiefly for having once saved the life of his cousin the future Emperor of Russia, Nicholas II in 1891 during their visit to Japan together.  He served as high commissioner of the Cretan State during its transition towards independence from Ottoman rule and union with Greece.

Youth
From 1883, George lived at Bernstorff Palace near Copenhagen with Prince Valdemar of Denmark, his father's younger brother. The queen had taken the boy to Denmark to enlist him in the Danish royal navy and consigned him to the care of Valdemar, who was an admiral in the Danish fleet. Feeling abandoned by his father on this occasion, George would later describe to his fiancée the profound attachment he developed for his uncle from that day forward.

In 1891, George accompanied his cousin the Tsesarevich Nicholas on his voyage to Asia, and saved him from an assassination attempt in Japan, in what became known as the Ōtsu Incident.

Greek endeavours

George, along with his brothers Constantine and Nicholas, were involved with the organization of the 1896 Summer Olympics in Athens. George served as president of the Sub-Committee for Nautical Sports. He served as a judge for the weightlifting competition, and demonstrated his strength by clearing the weights at the end of the event.

Although much of modern Greece had been independent since the 1820s, Crete remained in Ottoman hands. For the rest of the 19th century, there had been many rebellions and protests on the island. A Greek force arrived to annex the island in 1897 and the Great Powers acted, occupying the island and dividing it into British, French, Russian and Italian areas of control.

In 1898, Turkish troops were ejected and a national government was set up, still nominally under Ottoman suzerainty. Prince George, not yet thirty, was made High Commissioner, and a joint Muslim-Christian assembly was part-elected, part-appointed. However, this was not enough to satisfy Cretan nationalists.

Eleftherios Venizelos was the leader of the movement to unite Crete with Greece. He had fought in the earlier revolts and was now a member of the Assembly, acting as minister of justice to Prince George. They soon found themselves opposed. George, a staunch royalist, had assumed absolute power. Venizelos led the opposition to this. In 1905, however, he summoned an illegal revolutionary assembly in Theriso, in the hills near Chania, the then capital of the island, the "Theriso revolt".

During the revolt, the newly created Cretan Gendarmerie remained faithful to George. In this difficult period, the Cretan population were divided: in the 1906 elections the pro-Prince parties took 38,127 votes, while pro-Venizelos parties took 33,279. But the Gendarmerie managed to execute its duties without taking sides. Finally, British diplomats brokered a settlement and in September 1906 George was replaced by former Greek prime minister Alexandros Zaimis, and left the island. In 1908, the Cretan Assembly unilaterally declared enosis (union) with Greece.

In October 1912 George returned from Paris to Athens so that he could join the naval ministry as Greece prepared for war against Turkey. Later he served as aide-de-camp to King George who, however, was assassinated in March 1913. George went to Copenhagen to settle his father's financial affairs there, as he had never ceased to be a Prince of Denmark.

Marriage and family

Following a Parisian luncheon between King George and Prince Roland Bonaparte in September 1906 during which the king agreed to the prospect of a marriage between their children, George met Roland's daughter, Marie Bonaparte (2 July 1882 – 21 September 1962) on 19 July 1907 at the Bonapartes' home in Paris. A member of one of the non-imperial branches of the Bonaparte dynasty, she was an heiress to the Blanc casino fortune through her mother.

Although a homosexual, who lived most of the year with his uncle Prince Valdemar of Denmark with whom he had a life-long relationship, he dutifully courted her for twenty-eight days. He confided to her that he had experienced major disappointments when his roles in the Otsu incident and the Cretan governorship were misconstrued and under-appreciated by both individuals and governments who he felt should have known better. He also admitted that, contrary to what he knew were her hopes, he could not commit to living in France permanently since he had to remain prepared to undertake royal duties in Greece or Crete if summoned to do so. Once his proposal of marriage was tentatively accepted, the bride's father was astonished when George waived any contractual clause guaranteeing an allowance or inheritance from Marie; she would retain and manage her own fortune (a trust yielding 800,000 francs per annum) and only their future children would receive legacies.

George wed Marie civilly in Paris on 21 November 1907, and in a Greek Orthodox ceremony in Athens the following December, during which George's uncle Valdemar served as the koumbaros. By March Marie was pregnant and, as agreed, the couple returned to France to take up residence. When George brought his bride to Bernstorff for the first family visit, Valdemar's wife Marie d'Orléans was at pains to explain to Marie Bonaparte the intimacy which united uncle and nephew, so deep that at the end of each of George's several yearly visits to Bernstorff, he would weep, Valdemar would take sick, and the women learned the patience not to intrude upon their husbands' private moments. During the first of these visits, Marie Bonaparte and Valdemar found themselves engaging in the kind of passionate intimacies she had looked forward to with her husband who, however, only seemed to enjoy them vicariously, sitting or lying beside his wife and uncle. On a later visit, Marie Bonaparte carried on a passionate flirtation with Prince Aage, Valdemar's eldest son. In neither case does it appear that George objected, or felt obliged to give the matter any attention. However, George criticized Marie d'Orléans to his wife, alleging that she drank too much and was having an affair with his uncle's stablemaster. But Marie Bonaparte found no fault with her husband's aunt, rather, she admired the forbearance and independence of Valdemar's wife under circumstances which caused her bewilderment and estrangement from her own husband.

From 1913 to early 1916, George's wife carried on an intense flirtation, then an affair until May 1919 with French prime minister Aristide Briand. In 1915 Briand wrote to Marie that, having come to know and like Prince George, he felt guilty about their secret passion. George tried to persuade him that Greece, officially neutral during World War I but suspected of sympathy for the Central Powers, really hoped for an Allied victory: He may have influenced Briand to support the disastrous Allied expedition against the Turks at Salonika. When the prince and princess returned in July 1915 to France following a visit to the ailing King Constantine I in Greece, her affair with Briand had become notorious and George expressed a restrained jealousy. By December 1916 the French fleet was bombing Athens and in Paris Briand was suspected, alternately, of having seduced Marie in a futile attempt to bring Greece over to the Allied side, or of having been seduced by her to oust Constantine and set George upon the Greek throne.

Although he was on friendly terms with his wife's mentor, Sigmund Freud, in 1925 George asked Marie to give up her work as a psychoanalyst to devote herself to their family life, but she declined. When he learned from the newspapers in 1938 that his only son had married a Russian commoner, George forbade him to return home and refused ever to meet his wife.

Prince George and Princess Marie had two children, Petros and Evgenia.
 Prince Peter of Greece and Denmark (1908–1980); an anthropologist, who forfeited his dynastic rights in Greece upon marriage to a twice-divorced commoner. No children.
 Princess Eugénie of Greece and Denmark (1910–1988); married, firstly, Prince Dominic Radziwill (1939), whom she divorced in 1946. Her second husband was HSH Prince Raymundo della Torre e Tasso, Duke of Castel Duino, whom she married in 1949 and divorced in 1965. She had children from both marriages.

In 1948, Prince George was named as one of the sponsors/godparents of his grandnephew Prince Charles of the United Kingdom (later King Charles III) along with King George VI, King Haakon VII of Norway, Queen Mary, Princess Margaret, the Dowager Marchioness of Milford Haven, Pamela, Lady Brabourne, and David Bowes-Lyon.

Death
On 21 November 1957 Princess Marie and her husband celebrated their golden wedding anniversary. Prince George died 25 November 1957, aged eighty-eight, the longest-living dynast of the House of Oldenburg of his generation. He was buried at Tatoi Royal Cemetery with Danish and Greek flags, his wedding ring, a lock of Valdemar's hair, a photo of Valdemar, and earth from Bernstorff. Prince George was the last living child of King George and Queen Olga.

Georgioupolis, a coastal resort between Chania and Rethimno, was named after Prince George.

Honours

 :
 Knight of the Order of the Elephant, 25 November 1888
 Cross of Honour of the Order of the Dannebrog, 3 August 1889
 Grand Commander of the Order of the Dannebrog, 10 July 1920
 Commemorative Medal for the Golden Wedding of King Christian IX and Queen Louise
 King Christian IX Centenary Medal
 Navy Long Service Medal
 King Christian X's Liberty Medal
 : Grand Cordon of the Order of the Chrysanthemum, 14 May 1891
 : Grand Cross of the Royal Hungarian Order of Saint Stephen, 1896
 : Grand Cross of the Grand Ducal Hessian Order of Ludwig, 18 April 1904
 : Knight of the Supreme Order of the Most Holy Annunciation, 2 May 1893
 : Grand Cross of the Royal Norwegian Order of Saint Olav, with Collar, 19 March 1929
 : Knight of the Order of the Black Eagle
 : Knight of the Imperial Order of Saint Andrew the Apostle the First-called
 : Knight of the Royal Order of the Seraphim, 20 May 1919
 : Honorary Knight Grand Cross of the Most Honourable Order of the Bath (civil division), 29 June 1900
: Honorary Knight Grand Cross of the Royal Victorian Order

Ancestry

See also
 International Squadron (Cretan intervention, 1897–1898)

References

1869 births
1957 deaths
George of Greece, Prince
George of Greece, Prince
House of Glücksburg (Greece)
High Commissioners of Crete
Greek people of Danish descent
Burials at Tatoi Palace Royal Cemetery
Nobility from Corfu
Hellenic Navy admirals
Danish admirals
Recipients of the Cross of Honour of the Order of the Dannebrog
Grand Commanders of the Order of the Dannebrog
Grand Crosses of the Order of Saint Stephen of Hungary
Honorary Knights Grand Cross of the Order of the Bath
Sons of kings
LGBT royalty